= Edmund J. Campion =

American composer

Edmund J. Campion (born July 9, 1957) is an American composer whose work includes acoustic, electronic, electroacoustic, and mixed-media music. He is Distinguished Professor of Music at the University of California, Berkeley, where he has been on the faculty since 1996.

== Biography ==
Campion was born in Dallas, Texas. He studied composition at the University of Texas at Austin with Donald Grantham and Russell Pinkston. He completed master's and doctoral studies in composition at Columbia University, where he worked with Mario Davidovsky and Chou Wen-chung.

Campion participated in IRCAM's Cursus program, where Losing Touch was premiered in 1995. IRCAM subsequently commissioned works including Natural Selection, Play-Back, and Corail. He served as Director of the Center for New Music and Audio Technologies (CNMAT) from 2014 to 2024 and as Co-Director from 2024 to 2026. He also co-founded the ECO Ensemble with conductor David Milnes at UC Berkeley.

== Career ==
In 2008, Albany Records released Outside Music: Music of Edmund Campion, a recording by the San Francisco Contemporary Music Players devoted to Campion's music.

In 2012, Kronos Quartet joined the Santa Rosa Symphony for the world premiere of Campion's Concerto for String Quartet, Orchestra and Electronics (The Last Internal Combustion Engine), presented during his residency as composer-in-residence with the orchestra. That year, a Bay Citizen preview published by The New York Times discussed Campion's piano concerto Flow, Debris, Fall, noting its use of a computer-driven piano within a 17-member acoustic ensemble.

Campion's orchestral work Practice, for orchestra and computer, was included on the American Composers Orchestra digital album Orchestra Underground: Tech & Techno. In a 2014 Second Inversion review, Maggie Stapleton described the work as combining orchestral forces with an electronic, computer-generated conclusion.

In 2013, Campion's Ossicles (Tiny Bones) received its world premiere at the Berkeley Symphony's season opener; the work was co-commissioned by the Berkeley Symphony and Cal Performances.

Campion's multimedia work Cluster.X, created with video and sound artist Kurt Hentschläger, was presented at the Philharmonie de Paris in October 2015 and performed by the Ensemble intercontemporain during its 2015 Cal Performances residency at UC Berkeley. In San Francisco Classical Voice, Giacomo Fiore described Cluster.X as an intermedia work combining Hentschläger's video and electronic soundtrack with Campion's live instrumental accompaniment, calling the piece "eminently memorable".

In 2019, Campion created Berkeley Rain, a site-specific outdoor sound installation for the Downtown Berkeley BART Plaza. The work followed a public sound-art commission series announced in 2018.

In 2020, Ars Electronica's In Kepler's Gardens festival featured the long-term collaborative project ALICE, ALICES UNCHAINED, and THE FLOWER MATRIX by Campion and digital artist Claudia Hart. The project included works developed through their Alices collaboration since 2013.

Campion's published scores include works issued by Éditions Billaudot and Éditions Henry Lemoine in Paris.

== Music and reception ==
Campion's music has been discussed in scholarship on spectral music. In The Spectral Piano: From Liszt, Scriabin, and Debussy to the Digital Age, Marilyn Nonken discusses Campion's A Complete Wealth of Time in relation to technology, piano writing, and philosophical aesthetics. Campion has also written about the influence of spectral music on his work, especially his time in Paris, study with Gérard Grisey, and engagement with IRCAM.

== Honors and awards ==
Campion's honors include the Charles Ives Scholarship from the American Academy and Institute of Arts and Letters in 1991; the Paul Fromm Award at Tanglewood in 1992; the Lili Boulanger Memorial Fund Composition Award in 1993; the Rome Prize from the American Academy in Rome in 1995; the Walter Hinrichsen Award from the American Academy of Arts and Letters in 1999; a Goddard Lieberson Fellowship from the American Academy of Arts and Letters in 2012; and a Guggenheim Fellowship in music composition in 2016.
